Clark Wilbur Mills (1915, Michigan - December 11, 2001, Clearwater Florida) was an American designer and builder of boats.

He was best known as the designer of economical and practical boats such as the Optimist pram, Windmill, Com-Pac 16 and others. He began building boats before World War II and after the war opened the Mills Boat Works in Clearwater, Florida.

Mills was inducted into the National Sailing Hall of Fame in 2017.

Designs
Com-Pac 16
Com-Pac 23
Com-Pac Sun Cat
Com-Pac Sunday Cat
Optimist
US1
Windmill

References
Sailing Magazine, March 1999: An 8-foot giant of a sailboat
Hutchins Company Profile discusses the Com-Pac 16 designed by Clark Mills.
Builder of Snipes.
National Sailing Hall of Fame Induction

Footnotes

American boat builders
American yacht designers
1915 births
2001 deaths
20th-century American engineers